Chibhal was a princely state founded by a cadet branch of the Katoch Rajputs of Kangra in 1400.

History
Chibhal's first ruler was Raja Partab chand Katoch, who was the youngest son of Raja Megh chand Katoch of Kangra. Chibhal was also known to Timur's historians under the name Jibhal. The territory of Chibhal originally  included upper the hill region bordering Hazara.

The inhabitants of the state were known as Chibhalis. The northern barrier of India, a popular account of the Jammu and Kashmir territories by Frederic Drew 1877, page 30–31. Chibs who ruled this princely state are the direct descendants of Raja Chib Chand Katoch from whom the term Chib, Chibhan and Chibhal are derived. In 1822, the state's territories were reduced to no more than twenty five kilometres due to invasions from the Sikh Empire. The state was then referred to as the state of Bhimber. At that time it included the towns of Bhimber, Samhani and Mangal Devi. The Chibhalis were known to fiercely resist the Sikhs. They were seen as a threat by Maharaja Ranjit Singh and then son of Maharaja Ranjit Singh i.e. Prince Kharak Singh called Maharaja of Chibhal to Jammu to sign a peace treaty but there the Maharaja was putted in jail, his kingdom was invaded and annexed into the Sikh Empire.

Forts

 Bhagsar Fort Bhimber.
 Ramkort Fort, Mangla Dam.
 Throchi Fort Kotli.
 Mangla Fort, Mangla
 Barnad Fort, Sehnsa

Jagir-Shahdara near Lahore

After the giving over of Jammu and Kashmir to Maharaja Gulab Singh, it became necessary to take measures for the protection and maintenance of the minor hill chiefs, who, much against their will had been included in the “properties” forming part of the contract. The matter was arranged in 1847 by        Sir Henry Lawrence, Agent and Resident at Lahore, on the one part, and by Diwan Jwala Sahai, the Maharaja's Minister, on the other. It was agreed that such of the chiefs as elected to settle in British territory should receive perpetual pensions, amounting in the aggregate to Rs., 42,800 annually; the Maharaja ceding to, the British Government the ilaka of Sujanpur, part of Pathankot, and certain lands between the Beas and Chaki rivers north of Gurdaspur in satisfaction of the demands, which were to be met from the British treasuries. The Raja Faiz Talib Khan, styled as Bhimbarwala  by Sir Henry Lawrence, was allowed hereunder a cash pension of Rs. 10,000 per annum, the same being declared perpetual in his family, to be enjoyed undivided by one individual at a time. This arrangement did not of course please Faiz Talib, who thus found himself invested with a small pension in lieu his patrimony. But who was obliged to accept what had been fixed for him by Sir Henry Lawrence, as there was no hope of getting better terms from the Maharaja. He took up his abode at Shahdara near Lahore; and be it recorded to his credit that he and his relatives have ever since proved themselves thoroughly loyal to the new Power.

References

History of Azad Kashmir